Elections were held in Grey County, Ontario on October 24, 2022, in conjunction with municipal elections across the province.

Grey County Council
The Grey County Council consists of the mayors and deputy mayors of each of the constituent communities.

The Blue Mountains
The following were the results for mayor and deputy mayor of The Blue Mountains.

Mayor
Incumbent mayor Alar Soever did not run for re-election. Town councillor Andrea Matrosovs ran to replace him.

Deputy mayor

Chatsworth
The following were the results for mayor and deputy mayor of Chatsworth.

Mayor

Deputy mayor

Georgian Bluffs
The following were the results for mayor and deputy mayor of Georgian Bluffs.

Mayor
Incumbent mayor Dwight Burley was challenged by deputy mayor Sue Carleton.

Deputy mayor

Grey Highlands
The following were the results for mayor and deputy mayor of Grey Highlands.

Mayor
Incumbent mayor Paul McQueen was challenged by municipal councillor Danielle Valiquette, and Don Alp.

Deputy mayor

Hanover
The following were the results mayor and deputy mayor of Hanover.

Mayor

Deputy mayor

Meaford
The following were the results for mayor and deputy mayor of Meaford.

Mayor
Municipal councillors Ross Kentner and Paul Vickers ran for mayor.

Deputy mayor

Owen Sound
The following were the results for mayor and deputy mayor of Owen Sound.

Mayor

Deputy mayor

Southgate
The following were the results for mayor and deputy mayor of Southgate.

Mayor
Incumbent mayor John Woodbury did not run for re-election. Deputy mayor and former mayor Brian Milne ran against councillor Michael Sherson to replace him.

Deputy mayor

West Grey
The following were the results for mayor and deputy mayor of West Grey.

Mayor
Incumbent mayor Christine Robinson was  challenged by former mayor Kevin Eccles and municipal councillor Stephen Townsend.

Deputy mayor

References

Grey
Grey County